is a Japanese former professional footballer who played as a forward. He started his career at Shonan Bellmare, before later playing for Omiya Ardija, Sanfrecce Hiroshima, Urawa Red Diamonds and Vegalta Sendai before announcing his retirement in March 2022. He made over 500 appearances at senior club level in Japan.

Club statistics
.

1Includes Japanese Super Cup, FIFA Club World Cup and J.League Championship.

Honours

Club
Sanfrecce Hiroshima
J1 League (2) : 2012, 2013
Japanese Super Cup (2) : 2013, 2014
Urawa Reds
J.League Cup (1): 2016

References

External links

1984 births
Living people
Association football people from Gunma Prefecture
Japanese footballers
J1 League players
J2 League players
Shonan Bellmare players
Omiya Ardija players
Sanfrecce Hiroshima players
Urawa Red Diamonds players
Vegalta Sendai players
Association football forwards